Minden Airport  is a public use airport in Webster Parish, Louisiana, United States. The airport is owned by the City of Minden and located two nautical miles (4 km) northwest of its central business district. It was formerly known as Minden-Webster Airport.

Although many U.S. airports use the same three-letter location identifier for the FAA and IATA, this airport is assigned MNE by the FAA but has no designation from the IATA (which assigned MNE to Mungeranie, South Australia, Australia).

Facilities and aircraft 
Minden Airport covers an area of 35 acres (14 ha) at an elevation of 278 feet (85 m) above mean sea level. It has one runway designated 1/19 with an asphalt surface measuring 5,004 by 75 feet (1,525 x 23 m).

For the 12-month period ending May 10, 2011, the airport had 15,000 aircraft operations, an average of 41 per day: 86% general aviation and 14% military. At that time there were 18 aircraft based at this airport: 89% single-engine, 6% multi-engine, and 6% ultralight.

References

External links 
 Minden Airport, official site
 Minden Airport, at City of Minden website
 Minden Airport (F24) at LaDOTD airport directory
 Aerial image as of March 1998 from USGS The National Map
 

Airports in Louisiana
Transportation in Webster Parish, Louisiana
Buildings and structures in Webster Parish, Louisiana
Minden, Louisiana